Žas (Žertva Ant Smūgio) is a Lithuanian musical group that mostly performs pop music and alternative rock. The group was formed in 1993 as a gangsta rap group, but the group also created rock and techno music.

The band was on a hiatus and only semi-active for a few years, but it returned in 2013 with a new single "Ne kažką".

Discography 
1993 - "Geras"
1996 - "U-Žas"
1997 - "Dozė"
1997 - "Man gerai" (single)
1997 - "Medinis skaitmeninis" (single)
1998 - "Man dar geriau"
1999 - "Po stikliuką" (single)
1999 - ŽAS and Žalgiris "Eurolyga" (single; written to commemorate Žalgiris basketball club for winning Euroleague 1998-99 season)
2000 - "Leninas"
2001 - "Taupa"
2002 - "Man Ramu"
2002 - "Europa"
2003 - "Fortūna" (written to commemorate Lithuanian national basketball team for winning the Eurobasket 2003)
2004 - "Mandarinai"
2005 - "Geriausi"
2007 - "Made in China"

Video clips 
 1997 - "Ne pieną gėręs ne nuo pieno ir mirsi"
 1997 - "Sudrumskime ramybę"
 1997 - "Man gerai"
 1998 - "Man gerai" (dance)
 1998 - "Norėjau skristi"
 1998 - "Tamsos vaikai"
 1999 - "Eurolyga"
 2000 - "Po stikliuką"
 2002 - "Palanga močiučių"
 2003 - "Myliu kiną"
 2003 - "Fortūna"
 2003 - "Tingiu"
 2004 - "Mandarinai"
 2005 - "Man be tavęs liūdna"
 2013 - "Ne kažką"
 2013 - "Silikonas"

DVD
 2005 - Visa tiesa apie Žas

References

External links 
Official website

Lithuanian musical groups